Thomas Bryan (born 1873) was an English footballer who played in the Football League in the late 19th century. His clubs included Woolwich Arsenal and New Brompton and he made 9 appearances in the League, scoring 1 goal.

References

Footballers from Plumstead
1873 births
English Football League players
Arsenal F.C. players
Gillingham F.C. players
Year of death missing
English footballers
Association footballers not categorized by position